In extremal graph theory, the even circuit theorem is a result of Paul Erdős according to which an -vertex graph that does not have a simple cycle of length  can only have  edges. For instance, 4-cycle-free graphs have  edges, 6-cycle-free graphs have  edges, etc.

History

Lower bounds

The bound of Erdős's theorem is tight up to constant factors for some small values of k: for k = 2, 3, or 5, there exist graphs with  edges that have no -cycle.

It is unknown for  other than 2, 3, or 5 whether there exist graphs that have no -cycle but have  edges, matching Erdős's upper bound. Only a weaker bound is known,  according to which the number of edges can be

Constant factors
Because a 4-cycle is a complete bipartite graph,
the maximum number of edges in a 4-cycle-free graph can be seen as a special case of the Zarankiewicz problem on forbidden complete bipartite graphs, and the even circuit theorem for this case can be seen as a special case of the Kővári–Sós–Turán theorem.  More precisely, in this case it is known that the maximum number of edges in a 4-cycle-free graph is

 conjectured that, more generally, the maximum number of edges in a -cycle-free graph is

However, later researchers found that there exist 6-cycle-free graphs and 10-cycle-free graphs with a number of edges that is larger by a constant factor than this conjectured bound, disproving the conjecture. More precisely, the maximum number of edges in a 6-cycle-free graph lies between the bounds

The maximum number of edges in a 10-cycle-free graph can be at least

References

Extremal graph theory
Theorems in graph theory